The European Organization for Nuclear Research (CERN) is an international, intergovernmental organisation. Its activities are carried out on land placed at its disposal by the Canton of Geneva, the Swiss Confederation and France. In accordance with the agreements reached between France, Switzerland and CERN governing the organisation's legal status, the CERN site is placed under the authority and control of the Director-General as the organisation's chief executive officer. The latter is thus empowered to issue internal rules applicable to all persons entering the CERN site and intended to establish thereon the conditions necessary for the exercise of its functions.

CERN street names were for a long time an internal matter to the organisation. In 2013 the Canton of Geneva officially recognised CERN street names.

References

CERN
CERN
CERN
streets
CERN